My Country is a 2011 Brazilian drama film co-written and directed by   and starring Rodrigo Santoro, Cauã Reymond, Débora Falabella, Anita Caprioli and Paulo José.

Plot 
Marcos is a successful and married businessman in Italy. After years out of Brazil, he is forced to return to his country when his father Armando dies from a stroke. On his return, he finds his brother Tiago, who, on the other hand, is not intended for business. During the period of mourning, Marcos and Tiago have to live together by smoothing out their differences. To increase the conflict between the two brothers is the discovery of the existence of a half-sister who suffers from mental problems, Manuela, a daughter that Armando has always kept hidden from the whole family.

Cast   
Rodrigo Santoro as Marcos
Cauã Reymond as  Tiago
Débora Falabella  as Manuela
Anita Caprioli  as  Giulia
Paulo José as Armando
 Eduardo Semerjian as  Dr. Osvaldo
 Luciano Chirolli as  Moreira
 Nicola Siri as  Giovanni
 Stephanie de Jongh as  Joana

References

External links  

 
2011 drama films
2011 films
Brazilian drama films
2010s Portuguese-language films